Kappa Arae (κ Ara, κ Arae) is the Bayer designation for a single star in the southern constellation of Ara. Based upon parallax measurements, it is approximately  distant from Earth, give or take a 30 light-year margin of error. With an apparent visual magnitude of 5.21, this star is faintly visible to the naked eye.

This is a giant star with a stellar classification of G8 III; its outer envelope has expanded to about 14 times the radius of the Sun. It is radiating energy into space at an effective temperature of 4,950 K. This is hot enough for it to shine with the golden-hued glow of a G-type star.

It has two 14th magnitude optical companions that are at an angular distance of 25 and 30 arcseconds.

References

External links
 HR 6468
 CCDM 17260-5038
 Image Kappa Arae

157457
Arae, Kappa
Ara (constellation)
G-type giants
085312
6468
Durchmusterung objects